The 2001 Zagreb local elections were held on 21 May 2001 for members of the Zagreb Assembly. Milan Bandić, the incumbent mayor since 2000, led the list of the Social Democratic Party of Croatia (SDP), the largest centre-left party in the country and at the time a member of the governing coalition of Croatia.

Out of 29 lists that participated in the elections, only four passed the electoral threshold. The SDP won 20 seats in the Assembly and formed a coalition with the Croatian People's Party (HNS), which won 12 seats. The centre-right Croatian Democratic Union (HDZ) coalition came second with 14 seats, while an independent list of Miroslav Tuđman won five. Milan Bandić was re-elected mayor by the Zagreb Assembly on 20 June.

Results

Assembly election

See also
List of mayors of Zagreb

References 

Zagreb 2001
Zagreb
Zagreb local election
Elections in Zagreb
2000s in Zagreb